The 2016 Colonial Athletic Association football season was the tenth season of football for the Colonial Athletic Association (CAA) and part of the 2016 NCAA Division I FCS football season.

Previous season

Head coaches

Records are from before start of 2016 season

Preseason poll results
First place votes in parentheses

Rankings

Regular season

All times Eastern time.

Rankings reflect that of the STATS FCS poll for that week.

Week One

Players of the week:

Week Two

Players of the week:

Week Three

Players of the week:

Week Four

Players of the week:

Week Five

Players of the week:

Week Six

Players of the week:

Week Seven

Players of the week:

Week Eight

Players of the week:

Week Nine

Players of the week:

Week Ten

Players of the week:

Week Eleven

Players of the week:

Week Twelve

Players of the week:

FCS Playoffs

Postseason Awards

Coach of the Year – Mike Houston (James Madison)
Offensive Player of the Year – Bryan Schor, JR, QB (James Madison)
Defensive Players of the Year – Tanoh Kpassagnon, SR, DL (Villanova)
Special Teams Player of the Year – Rashard Davis, SR, PR/WR (James Madison)
Offensive Rookies of the Year – Shane Simpson, FR, RB (Towson)
Defensive Rookies of the Year – Prince Smith, Jr., FR, CB (New Hampshire)
Chuck Boone Leadership Award – Casey DeAndrade, SR, CB (New Hampshire)

All–Conference Teams

Records against other conferences

Attendance

References